General council may refer to:

In education:

 General council (Scottish university), an advisory body to each of the ancient universities of Scotland
 General Council of the University of St Andrews, the corporate body of all graduates and senior academics of the University of St Andrews

In medicine:

 General Dental Council, a United Kingdom organisation which regulates all dental professionals in the country
 General Medical Council, the regulator of the medical profession in the United Kingdom
 General Optical Council, an organisation in the United Kingdom that regulates opticians and optometrists

In politics and government:

 Crow Tribal General Council, a tribal assembly comprising all enrolled members of the Crow Nation
 General Council of Bucharest, the legislative body of the Municipality of Bucharest
 General councils of France, the legislative bodies of the departments of France, which since March 2015 are officially called Departmental Councils (French: Conseils départementaux, sing. Conseil départemental)
 General Council of the Judicial Power of Spain, the autonomous institution which governs all the judicial instances of Spain
 General Council of Mayotte, a legislature
 General Council of Saint-Pierre and Miquelon, a dependency legislature
 General Council of Scotland, late 14th century - early 16th century, a sister institution to the Scots Parliament
 General Council (Andorra), the unicameral parliament of Andorra
 Grand and General Council, the parliament of San Marino
In trade:

 General Council (TUC), a decision body of the Trades Union Congress which meets every two months
 General Council (WTO), the highest decision-making body after the Ministerial Conference in the World Trade Organization

In religion:
 General council (Christianity), a meeting of the bishops of a whole church convened to discuss and settle matters of church doctrine
 General Council of the Assemblies of God, the formal name of a Pentecostal denomination. 
 General Council of the Evangelical Lutheran Church in North America, in existence from 1867 to 1918

In other fields:
 General Social Care Council, a public body which has responsibility for registering and regulating social workers and social care workers

See also

 General Teaching Council (disambiguation)
 General counsel